is a railway station in Tagawa, Fukuoka Prefecture, Japan. It is on the Ita Line, operated by the Heisei Chikuhō Railway. Trains arrive roughly every 30 minutes.

On 1 April 2009, a local recycling plant, Kanda Shōten, acquired naming rights to the station.

Platforms

External links
Hoshii Station (Heisei Chikuhō Railway website)

References

Railway stations in Fukuoka Prefecture
Railway stations in Japan opened in 1900
Heisei Chikuhō Railway Ita Line